Charles Dumont may refer to:
Charles Dumont (politician) (1867–1939), French politician
Charles Dumont (singer) (born 1929), French singer and composer
Charles Dumont de Sainte-Croix (1758–1830), French zoologist